Vlas Kobara (born April 20, 1992) is a male TV personality, columnist, and pundit from Russia who works in Japan.

He founded and represents the talent agent "." In January 2022, he became a director of "Supporting Foreign Children to Attend School." He is also active as a YouTuber called "," a group of two Kansai people of Russian descent. In the past, he was also active as a  broadcaster "Buira."

He was born in Khabarovsk, Russia and grew up in Himeji, Hyogo, Japan from the age of five. He calls himself "a gay Russian with a troublesome personality who speaks Kansai dialect.

History

Upbringing 
He was born at Khabarovsk in the Far Eastern Federal District of Russia. While he was still an unborn child, the Soviet Union dissolved and the political system changed to Russia.

He was born to Russian parents, and his nationality is still Russian, and he is one of the Russians in Japan.

During his childhood, Russian society was extremely poor, having just transitioned from socialism to capitalism. People were struggling to grow crops in the fields (dacha) and bartering, and the elderly were babysitting the workers, helping each other to overcome the economic crisis.

His family background was in politics, but his mother was a singer and he wanted to be a singer when he was a child.

His mother had visited Japan on business and bought some Japanese sweets for him as a souvenir and went back to Russia. Holding that microphone and lip-synching to Russian music programs was one of the happiest memories of his boyhood.

Moved to Japan 
When he was five years old, he moved to Himeji, Hyogo, Japan, when his mother remarried a Japanese man.

He later went back to Russia periodically, although he lived and was educated in Japan. He says, "I grew up witnessing the gap between Japan, which had grown to its fullest economic potential, and Russia, which was trying to rebuild its dissolved economy."

Popularity on Niconico Live 
In July 2010, at the age of 18, he started 

The video "a Russian use a pressure cooker for the first time on air and make a big fuss" that viewers reprinted from his broadcast became a big hit, and he became a very popular.

Experience in Shinjuku Ni-Chome 
In 2012, he moved to Tokyo The first place he was taken to by his first friend in Tokyo was Shinjuku Ni-chōme, the most biggest gay village in Japan.

Foreigners fluent in Japanese and gay men were not uncommon in Shinjuku Ni-chōme, and there were many people just like him. No one was surprised if someone was cross-dressing, dressed flamboyantly, or spoke in gay male speech. Furthermore, he saw many people of a gender he had never heard of.

He felt comfortable talking to the people of Shinjuku Ni-chōme. This was not because he was inconspicuous, but because no one asked him questions such as "what kind of girls do you like?" as if they assumed his sexual orientation was heterosexual.

Earlier, when he revealed to someone he met for the first time that "I am gay," the conversation went on as if "everything about me consists of 'gay'." In reality, being gay is only one part of what makes up who he is. He had a hard time coming out and often lied about it in everyday conversation. But in Shinjuku Ni-chōme, he did not have to lie. He said he learned that "lies unconsciously become a burden on the mind".

Back to activities 

On September 19, 2018, broadcast of a Japanese TV program "" (Tokyo MX), where he appeared as a substitute black ship correspondent and was well received by viewers for his logical remarks; from April 2019, he became a regular black ship correspondent on Wednesdays.

On December 22, 2020, he launched , a talent agent that manages and casts  in and around Japan. He was concerned about the tendency to exclude foreigners (nativism) in Japan and wanted to "act as a buffer between the Japanese and foreigners as a 'foreigner who understands Japan'."

References

External links 
 

Living people
1992 births
Russian gay writers
Japanese gay writers
Gay entertainers
People from Hyōgo Prefecture
People from Khabarovsk
Russian expatriates in Japan
21st-century Japanese writers
Expatriate television personalities in Japan
21st-century Russian LGBT people
21st-century Japanese LGBT people